Rantasalmi Airfield is an airfield in Rantasalmi, Finland, about  east of Rantasalmi municipal centre.

See also
List of airports in Finland

References

External links
 VFR Suomi/Finland – Rantasalmi Airfield
 Lentopaikat.net – Rantasalmi Airfield 

Airports in Finland